The 2021 FireKeepers Casino 400 was a NASCAR Cup Series race held on August 22, 2021, at Michigan International Speedway in Brooklyn, Michigan. Contested over 200 laps on the  D-shaped oval, it was the 25th race of the 2021 NASCAR Cup Series season.

Report

Background

The race was held at Michigan International Speedway, a  moderate-banked D-shaped speedway located in Brooklyn, Michigan. The track is used primarily for NASCAR events. It is known as a "sister track" to Texas World Speedway as MIS's oval design was a direct basis of TWS, with moderate modifications to the banking in the corners, and was used as the basis of Auto Club Speedway. The track is owned by International Speedway Corporation. Michigan International Speedway is recognized as one of motorsports' premier facilities because of its wide racing surface and high banking (by open-wheel standards; the 18-degree banking is modest by stock car standards). 

Josh Berry replaced Corey LaJoie for the race due to COVID-19 protocols; LaJoie, then unvaccinated, had been close to a person testing positive for the COVID-19 from his Stacking Pennies podcast a week prior.

Entry list
 (R) denotes rookie driver.
 (i) denotes driver who are ineligible for series driver points.

Qualifying
Kyle Larson was awarded the pole for the race as determined by competition-based formula.

Starting Lineup

Race

Kyle Larson started on pole. Chase Elliott won the first stage while Kyle Busch won the second stage. At the end of the second stage, Brad Keselowski made contact with Austin Dillon and sent Dillon spinning into the wall, ending his race. In the final stage, drivers had different pit strategies, with William Byron gaining the lead. A caution came out for rain with 21 laps to go and for a multicar wreck with 14 laps to go. Following a restart with eight laps to go, Ryan Blaney gained the lead and held off Byron and Kyle Larson to win the race, his second win of the season.

Stage Results

Stage One
Laps: 60

Stage Two
Laps: 60

Final Stage Results

Stage Three
Laps: 80

Race statistics
 Lead changes: 20 among 11 different drivers
 Cautions/Laps: 6 for 29
 Red flags: 0
 Time of race: 2 hours, 48 minutes and 27 seconds
 Average speed:

Media

Television
NBC Sports covered the race on the television side. Rick Allen, Jeff Burton, Steve Letarte and two-time Michigan winner, Dale Earnhardt Jr. called the race from the broadcast booth. Dave Burns, Parker Kligerman and Marty Snider handled the pit road duties from pit lane.

Radio
Radio coverage of the race was broadcast by Motor Racing Network (MRN) and simulcast on Sirius XM NASCAR Radio. Alex Hayden and Jeff Striegle called the race in the booth while the field was racing on the front stretch. Dave Moody called the race from a billboard outside of turn 2 when the field is racing through turns 1 and 2. Kyle Rickey called the race from a platform outside of turn 3 when the field races through turns 3 and 4. Steve Post and Kim Coon worked pit road for the radio side.

Standings after the race

Drivers' Championship standings

Manufacturers' Championship standings

Note: Only the first 16 positions are included for the driver standings.
. – Driver has clinched a position in the NASCAR Cup Series playoffs.

References

FireKeepers Casino 400
FireKeepers Casino 400
NASCAR races at Michigan International Speedway
FireKeepers Casino 400